Thornography is the seventh studio album by English extreme metal band Cradle of Filth. It was released on 17 October 2006, by record label Roadrunner. It was produced by former Anthrax guitarist Rob Caggiano, engineered by Dan Turner and mixed by Andy Sneap, and once again features narration by Doug Bradley (as with Midian and Nymphetamine). It is Cradle of Filth's second album as a five-piece, as keyboardist Martin Powell left the band in 2005. This would also be the band's final album to feature drummer Adrian Erlandsson, and the only full-length to feature guitarist Charles Hedger.

Content

Album title 
Dani Filth explained the album's title in 2006:

This title represents mankind's obsession with sin and self. The thorn combines images of that which troubled Christ, the Crown of Thorns, thus intimating man's seeming desire to hurt God and also of the protecting thorn and the need to enclose a secret place or the soul from attack. An addiction to self-punishment or something equally poisonous. A mania. Twisted desires. Barbed dreams. A fetish. An obsession with cruelty. Savage nature. Paganism over Christianity. The title can also represent a sexual attraction to religious iconography as in the case of the "possessed" Loudun nuns. I like the title because to me it invokes images of a darker, sexier pre-Raphaelite scene wherein Sleeping Beauty's castle is won and she is awoken by a poisonous kiss. A darker, more adult fairytale.

Album cover 

In news posted on the official Cradle of Filth website in mid-May 2006, it was revealed that the planned artwork for Thornography had been vetoed by Roadrunner Records. A replacement was soon forthcoming, although numerous CD booklets had already been printed with the original image. Filth stated in an interview with Metal Hammer that the controversy was over the nakedness of the female figure's legs on the original cover: "When we put the original next to the new version, it was so slightly changed... The nymph's skirt was a little longer. It was like a game of spot the difference". Charles Hedger told Gothtronic.com that the new cover "is practically the same... A lot of Americans are really religious and Roadrunner were basically saying that Wal-Mart was not going to take Cradle albums with that on the cover. But Wal-Mart never takes Cradle albums anyhow, so it doesn't make any difference."

Musical style 
Paul Allender told Terrorizer magazine:

There are quite a few guitar solos on this album. To be honest, I've never really classed myself as a lead player as such, but this is the first time I've sat down and seriously practiced lead work. I've been so involved in actually writing new material and coming up with song structures that I haven't had time to practice all the frilly things that go on top of it. Up 'till now, there hasn't really been much room for guitar solos as such. The riffs we write, they're not riffs that are meant to be soloed on top of. They're melodic within themselves. But I'm a great believer that less is definitely more. I love listening to all the shreddy, widdly stuff, but I have no interest in playing it. This new album is quite guitar-orientated. The last album was, but this is definitely more melodic. Dare I say it, there are quite a lot of typical Maiden-esque harmonies in there.

Track-by-track commentary 
Dani Filth provided the following explanations for the album's individual tracks in a press release:

 "Dirge Inferno"
Another end-of-world opus in the vein of "Cthulhu Dawn" or "Mother of Abominations". "Dirge Inferno" is the pseudonym for the "Great Beast" that arises and wages war during the Book of Revelation. He is the epitome of the turmoil and chaos of the end time. He characterizes mankind's warmongering nature and every attribute that is in conflict with stability and peace. He is Armageddon made flesh.

 "Tonight in Flames"
This concerns itself with fiery religious fanaticism stoked up by the sudden death of a loved one. The idea behind the song is that even the most ardent supporter of peace can be drawn into violent conflict if their faith is shattered beyond repair. The title reflects the onset of spiritual darkness that pervades and eventually clouds the mind through irrevocable grief and irretrievable loss. Without sounding too political, one can draw a parallel with the current clime of terrorism, where normally peaceful religious groups are being incensed to hatred.

 "Libertina Grimm"
Libertine Grimm is another gothic character who is actually an amalgam of many different women. She is sexy, erudite and possessed of an extraordinary wit, but this is counterbalanced by an unhealthy appetite for self-destruction and flights of morbid fancy, brought on by dark secrets, terribly chic drugs and wild, sexual abandonment. She is a gluttonous Miss Muffet; the fairy-tale girl who ate the Big Bad Wolf; and the beauty who slept with one eye on the coming talent. Libertina Grimm is every goth girl's coven mistress.

 "The Byronic Man"
Based on the infamous poet and libertine Lord Byron, the song is written from a first-hand perspective that is not only historical but also self-analytical, musing on the individual's slide into decline and relishing fully in its rich, unwholesome flavour. Ville Valo from HIM was asked to contribute vocals to this song, partly due to the need for a good clean male vocal, but mainly to have Byron portrayed by someone who may be the modern-day equivalent.

 "I Am the Thorn"
The closest thing to a title track on the album concerns itself with a livid God, who has seen the multitude of religious wars fought in his many names and has sent his right hand, The Thorn, an avenging angel of death, to mete out a collective punishment. If the concept of an all-encompassing God is to be believed, then why should it not be also believed that his will could turn grim and 'old testament' on the self-professed prophets who war in his name? "I Am the Thorn" is a song about the dire consequences of waging war in the name of religion and territory.

 "Cemetery and Sundown"
In response to Cradle's recent lull in all matters of a vampiric nature, this track is akin to a revenant anthem: a song that unites the legions of the undead, urging them to forget their covenant with mortal kind, come forth from the shadows and rekindle their passion to muster and master the night.

 "Lovesick for Mina"
Another song whose essence is undoubtedly in the title. Mina Harker is the intended bride of Bram Stoker's infamous Count Dracula. The lyrics in this case are set in a time when Mina is irrevocably lost to him and he is pining for his immortal beloved. This song is a blend of gothic romance and balls-to-the-wall thrash.

 "The Foetus of a New Day Kicking"
After a "long dark night of the soul" comes a dawn that is twice as potent. Using religious iconography as a theme once again and flirting with more modern tragedy, this song deals not only with the notion of despair and spiritual death, but also, far more importantly, with the resurrection, twice as strong, of the broken individual.

 "Under Huntress Moon"
This is a hymn to the beauty of the Moon, as personified by the celestial huntress Diana. The lyrics in this song are very reminiscent of Cradle's earlier works where Pagan imagery is imbued with strong female characteristics. The lyrics' morbid cadence hint at the author's bewitched state of mind.

Several further tracks were prepared during the Thornography sessions, but not finished until after the album's release. These were later added to the expanded Harder, Darker, Faster: Thornography Deluxe, and Filth spoke about them in the magazine Brave Words & Bloody Knuckles.

 "Murder in the Thirst"
One of our classic intros. The title was stolen from the lyrics of "Cemetery and Sundown".

 "The Snake-Eyed and the Venomous"
This is a sort of metaphorical anti-critic song.

 "Halloween II"
A Samhain cover. This has been remixed and remastered, so it sounds a bit better than it did on the Underworld: Evolution soundtrack, which was the only place it was available prior to this.

 "Courting Baphomet"
Another metaphorical, fable-type song, in the vein of "Her Ghost in the Fog".

 "Stay"
A track by Shakespears Sister that we've bastardised. Now it sounds a bit more like a symphonic "Nymphetamine".

 "Devil to the Metal"
A celebration of everything dark and nasty. It could have come from V Empire; it's really fast and brutal, with some nice drop-downs and weird bits.

Recording 

Three cover versions were recorded during the album's sessions, namely Samhain's "Halloween II", Shakespears Sister's "Stay", and Heaven 17's "Temptation". "Halloween II" (renamed "HW2") was released on the Underworld: Evolution soundtrack. It is included as a bonus track on the Japanese release of the album. "Temptation" is part of Thornography's finalised track listing, and features vocals by Harry. Harry also stars in the promo video for the track, which was released a week before the album as a digital single. "Stay" surfaced in early 2008 on the Harder, Darker, Faster re-release (see below). A press release by Liv Kristine announced that "Stay" would be Kristine's second guest vocal spot with the band (following "Nymphetamine"). Paul Allender later confirmed however that the duet never actually took place, although versions were recorded with both Harry and Sarah Jezebel Deva. The latter is the version included on the re-release.

Early reports during the album's production process mentioned a track called "The Flora of Nightfall, The Fauna of War". It is unknown which track this was the working title for, although the words appear as a lyric in "Cemetery and Sundown".

Release

Thornography was released on 17 October 2006. It debuted at number 66 on the Billboard Top 200 chart, selling nearly 13,000 copies. It reached number 46 in the UK Albums Chart.

Harder, Darker, Faster: Thornography Deluxe 

Harder, Darker, Faster: Thornography Deluxe was released on 4 February 2008. This version is a CD-DVD package, with the original album in standard stereo format on CD and DVD and the following additional bonus tracks on the DVD only: "Murder in the Thirst", "The Snake-Eyed and the Venomous", "Halloween II" (a cover of the song by Samhain which had previously appeared on the soundtrack to the film Underworld: Evolution), "Courting Baphomet", "Stay" (a cover of the song by Shakespears Sister) and "Devil to the Metal". Original plans to include "Mater Lachrymarum", a song from the soundtrack to the 2007 Dario Argento film The Mother of Tears that Dani contributed to, were scrapped due to rights issues.

Critical reception

Critical response to Thornography has been generally favourable. Metal Hammer called it "undoubtedly their heaviest and most guitar-dominated record in many years", though commenting that the band's cover of Heaven 17's "Temptation" is "ridiculous" and "best avoided". Terrorizer called the album "sharp, slick, elegant, focused, catchy, accessible heavy gothic metal, with the dark romantic schtick still present, but reined in and more explicitly parodic". AllMusic commented on the album's comparatively more mainstream style: "...by the sound of Thornography, CoF are aiming at playing an arena near you sometime in the near future." PopMatters wrote: "Thornography, all things taken into consideration, is one of most solid additions in Cradle of Filth's history".

Kerrang!, on the other hand, commented: "The black magic for which they're usually so dependable is in short supply... If there was a word to sum Thornography up, it would be 'incomplete'..."

Track listing

Personnel

Cradle of Filth 
 Dani Filth – vocals
 Paul Allender – lead guitar
 Charles Hedger – rhythm guitar
 Dave Pybus – bass, backing vocals on "Halloween II"
 Adrian Erlandsson – drums
 Sarah Jezebel Deva – backing vocals, co-lead vocals on "Stay"

Session/guest musicians 
 Doug Bradley – narration on tracks 3 and 10
 Ville Valo – vocals on "The Byronic Man"
 Dirty Harry – vocals on "Temptation"
 Martin Walkyier – backing vocals on "The Snake-Eyed and the Venomous"
 Mark Newby-Robson – keyboards on original edition, "Courting Baphomet" and "Devil to the Metal"
 Christopher Jon – additional keyboards on original edition and "The Snake-Eyed and the Venomous"
 Chris Rehn – producer, composition and performance of track 1, orchestral arrangements on "Stay", backing vocals on track 1
 Tommy Rehn – producer and additional arrangements of track 1, orchestral arrangements on "Stay", backing vocals on track 1
 Veronica Rehn – vocals on track 1
 Tony Konberg, Hanna Tornqvist, Linnea Kibe – backing vocals on track 1
 Rob Caggiano – drums on "Stay", backing vocals on "Halloween II"
 Aric Prentice, Keith Halliday, Charlie Jenkins, Moira Johnson, Ruth Nixon, Chris Mitchell, Rachel Line, William Harrison, Sophie Allen, Laela Adamson – choir vocals
 Laura Reid – cello

Production
 Rob Caggiano – producer
 Dan Turner – engineer
 Andy Sneap - mixing and mastering at Backstage Studios, Derbyshire
 Daniel Presley – arrangement of orchestral passages, composition and arrangement of "Murder in the Thirst"

Charts

References 

Cradle of Filth albums
2006 albums
Roadrunner Records albums